North Village Rams is a Bermudian football club based in Pembroke Parish who participate in the Bermudian Premier Division.

History
The club, also named North Village Community Club, has won the Bermudian league title eight times.

On 17 July 2013 the club signed a development partnership contract with Scottish side Rangers. The club was coached by Ralph Bean Jr. and as assistant coach worked the former Bermuda national team captain Stephen Coddington.

Achievements
Singular Wireless Premier Division: 9
 1973/74, 1975/76, 1977/78, 1978/79, 2001/02, 2002/03, 2005/06, 2010/11, 2019/20

Bermuda FA Cup: 10
 1977/78, 1982/83, 1985/86, 1988/89, 1999/00, 2001/02, 2002/03, 2003/04, 2004/05, 2005/06, 2019–20

Year-by-year

Players

Current squad
 For 2015–2016 season

Notable players

Historical list of coaches

  Shaun Goater (2008–2013)
  Ralph Bean jr. (2013–2015)
  Richard Todd (2015–present)

References

External links
 Club page – Bermuda FA

Football clubs in Bermuda
Association football clubs established in 1957
1957 establishments in Bermuda